The 2022 Hawaii Rainbow Warriors football team represents the University of Hawaiʻi at Mānoa in the 2022 NCAA Division I FBS football season. Led by first-year head coach Timmy Chang, the Rainbow Warriors play their home games at the Clarence T. C. Ching Athletics Complex as members of the West Division of the Mountain West Conference.

Previous season 

The Rainbow Warriors finished the 2021 season with an overall record of 6–7 (3–5 Mountain West). They were invited and accepted a bid to play the University of Memphis in the Hawaii Bowl, but had to withdraw due to a number of players out to COVID-19.

On January 14, 2022, head coach Todd Graham resigned amid reports of player abuse released in a state senate meeting a week prior. Days later, former UH coach June Jones expressed interest in the job, submitting an application and garnering support. However, Jones declined the offer from the university, citing that terms offered were unacceptable. Former UH quarterback and Colorado State receivers coach Timmy Chang was instead named the 25th head coach in program history on January 22, signing a four-year deal.

In regards to the Ching Complex, athletics director David Matlin announced a further planned expansion to 15,000 or 16,000 would be delayed until 2023 due to effects stemming from the COVID-19 pandemic, which forced the first half of the 2021 home schedule to be played without fans or a limited capacity.

Schedule 
The home opener against Vanderbilt was the first sold-out home game since 2007, when the Rainbow Warriors played in front of two consecutive sellouts against Boise State and Washington. Ironically, the next game against Western Kentucky was also sold out, marking the first time since 2007 that consecutive sellouts were recorded.

Source:

Roster

Game summaries

Vanderbilt 

Statistics

Western Kentucky

at No. 4 Michigan

Duquesne

at New Mexico State

at San Diego State

Nevada

at Colorado State

Wyoming

at Fresno State

Utah State

UNLV

at San Jose State

References

Hawaii
Hawaii Rainbow Warriors football seasons
Hawaii Rainbow Warriors football